"Ichinensei Ni Nattara" (一年生になったら, "When I Become A First-Grader") is a Japanese-language children's song published in 1966.

The song's lyrics (under copyright protection) consist of a child singing about what they wish to do when they enter primary school, such as climbing Mount Fuji and eating onigiri with a hundred friends. It is often sung in kindergartens at graduation ceremonies.

From September 6, 2014, the song was used at the Tokuyama Station in Shunan City, Yamaguchi Prefecture.

References

Songs about childhood
Japanese children's songs
Japanese nursery rhymes
Japanese songs
Graduation songs
1966 singles